Ecclesall Woods is an area of woodland in south-west Sheffield, South Yorkshire, England, between Abbeydale Road South and Ecclesall. The Abbeydale miniature railway is also located within the woods.

They are a Local Nature Reserve.

Notable features 
There are two mills sited within the woods and several other items of archaeological interest.

Ryecroft Mill
Ryecroft Mill was a water-powered lead smelting mill on the Limb Brook. The mill dates from at least as far back as the 17th century and was used for lead smelting, and later grinding corn.

Ecclesall Woods Sawmill
There is a modern sawmill within the woods, which was built after extensive storm damage to trees in 1962. It is operated by a private company, but there are plans to use it as both a working sawmill and an information centre.

Ryecroft Bridge
The stone bridge over the Ryecroft Brook is a Grade II listed building.

Q pits 
There are a hundred charcoal hearths and two hundred Q pits, believed to have been used for manufacture of white coal.

Charcoal burner's grave 
There is a grave stone dating from 1786, commemorating the death of George Yardley killed in an accidental fire in his woodland home, after an evening in the local hostelry on Abbey Lane. There is also an information plaque about the incident on the wall of the Public House, which is still trading.  The grave is a grade II listed structure.

Prehistoric carved stone 

A cup and ring-marked stone was discovered in 1981, and has been dated to the late Neolithic or Bronze Age periods. It, and the  diameter around it, is a scheduled ancient monument.

References

External links 
Sheffield city council information page on Ecclesall Woods Discovery Centre

Parks in Sheffield
Local Nature Reserves in South Yorkshire
Forests and woodlands of South Yorkshire
Archaeological sites in South Yorkshire